Events from the year 1918 in Denmark.

Incumbents
 Monarch – Christian X
 Prime minister – Carl Theodor Zahle

Events

 22 April – The 1918 Folketing election takes place. Three women, the first in Danish history, are elected, among them Elna Munch.

Date unknown
 Kjøbenhavns Boldklub wins the 1917–18 Danish National Football Tournament by defeating Randers Freja 52 in the final.

Births
 9 April – Jørn Utzon, architect (died 2008)
 27 June – Willy Breinholst, author, screenwriter and humourist (died 2009)
 22 December – Lis Møller journalist and politician (died 1983)

Deaths
 4 January – Carl Aarsleff, sculptor (born 1852)
 29 March – Fanny Suenssen, author (born 1832)
 26 August – Rogert Møller, architect (born 1844)
 16 November – Johan Henrik Deuntzer, Prime Minister 1901–05 (born 1845)

References

 
Denmark
Years of the 20th century in Denmark
1910s in Denmark
Denmark